Tirathaba albilineata is a species of moth of the family Pyralidae. It was described by Whalley in the year 1964. It is found on Sumatra.

References 

Tirathabini
Moths described in 1964